Freddie Lee Barnes (born December 6, 1986) is a former American football wide receiver. He was signed by the Chicago Bears of the National Football League (NFL) as an undrafted free agent in 2010. He played college football at Bowling Green.

During 2009, including the Humanitarian Bowl, Barnes accumulated an NCAA Football Bowl Subdivision record 155 receptions for 1,770 yards, 19 receiving touchdowns, as well as two rushing touchdowns.  The 155-reception total not only surpassed the Division I record, but also an NCAA All-division record. He also broke Randy Moss' single-season Mid-American Conference yardage record. In addition, he established several Bowling Green Falcons football records during the season. During his senior season, in established numerous receiving records, was named a 2009 College Football All-American and was one of three 2009 Fred Biletnikoff Award finalists.  Previously, he had been a multisport athlete at Homewood-Flossmoor High School.

Early years
Barnes attended Homewood-Flossmoor High School in Flossmoor, Illinois, where he earned three letters for the Vikings playing quarterback. He served as team captain and was named team MVP, as well as All-Area and All-Conference in 2004. Barnes also lettered in basketball, where he was a teammate of Julian Wright.

Considered only a two-star recruit by Rivals.com, Barnes was not ranked among the nation's elite quarterback prospects in 2005. He chose Bowling Green over Eastern Michigan and Indiana.

College career
Barnes' freshman season he caught 20 passes for 203 yards, two touchdowns, and rushed for 405 yards and 9 touchdowns. As a sophomore, he caught 82 passes for 962 yards and 9 touchdowns, and was selected for All-Mid-American Conference third-team honors. He caught 41 passes for 364 yards, but no touchdowns as a Junior in 2008.

During his senior year in 2009 he accumulated 16 touchdown catches and a league leading 138 receptions. He is third in reception yards with 1,551, and among his season's highlights was a school-record 22-catch effort (one short of an NCAA single-game record) for 278 yards, including three touchdowns, in a 36-35 victory over Kent State. Barnes was four receptions away from matching the NCAA single-season record as Bowling Green awaited its bowl game against the Idaho Vandals. In his final game at Bowling Green against the Idaho Vandals in the Humanitarian Bowl, Barnes had 17 receptions for 219 yards and 3 touchdowns including a go-ahead score with 32 seconds left in the game. It turned out to be enough time for the Vandals to answer on their final drive, and they converted a two-point conversion for the win.  Barnes established both new Football Bowl Subdivision and All Division single-season reception records by surpassing Manny Hazard and Nick Smart, respectively.  On the season, Barnes' 1770 yards surpassed Randy Moss MAC single-season total.  Barnes also surpassed several school records such as single-season touchdown receptions and career receptions.  Barnes' yardage total and yards per game were second to Danario Alexander among FBS receivers for 2009.

Barnes was chosen as one of three finalists for the Fred Biletnikoff Award. Notre Dame's Golden Tate won the award. Barnes was also discussed as a dark horse candidate for the 2009 Heisman Trophy, despite being on a BCS non-AQ conference team and not being a quarterback, based on thirty more catches than any other receiver and being close to the top in touchdowns. Barnes was named to the All-Mid-American Conference first-team on December 2, 2009, and on December 12, he was named a 2009 All-American by the Football Writers Association of America.

College awards and honors
2009 All-American (FWAA)
2009 Biletnikoff Award finalist

National Collegiate Athletic Association record
Single-season receptions (155, 2009–) (both Division I and All Divisions)

Mid-American Conference record
Single-season receiving yards (1770, 2009–)

Bowling Green record
Career receptions (298, 2009–)
Single-season touchdown receptions (19, 2009–)
Single-game receptions (22, 2009–)
Single-game receiving yards (278, 2009–)

Professional career

2010 NFL Draft
Wes Bunting of National Football Post opined that Barnes may lack the speed to be an elite NFL receiver, but stated that "he certainly has the talent to fill out an NFL receiving corps." At the 2010 East-West Shrine Game practice, Barnes "impressed scouts with the ability to consistently separate from defensive backs and find the openings in the coverage," according to Sports Illustrated's Tony Pauline.

Chicago Bears
Barnes signed as an undrafted free agent with the Chicago Bears on April 24, 2010. He was waived on September 3, and was re-signed to the team's practice squad on November 2.

Chicago Rush
Barnes was also a member of the Arena Football Team Chicago Rush, having signed a contract on October 8, 2010. He was on a league exemption during his stint with the Chicago Bears after being signed to the practice squad on November 2, 2010. He then returned to the Rush on December 15, 2010 after being released by the Bears.

Saskatchewan Roughriders
Barnes was signed to the practice roster of the Saskatchewan Roughriders on August 9, 2011. He appeared in one regular season game in 2011, but was released on January 31, 2012.

Personal life
His hometown is Chicago Heights, Illinois. His mother, Clarissa Charles, who had him at age 14, dropped out of high school, but later earned her high school equivalency degree, then her college degree.

See also
 List of NCAA major college football yearly receiving leaders

References

External links

Official biography at Bowling Green
Barnes at ESPN.com
Barnes at NCAA.org

1986 births
Living people
Players of Canadian football from Chicago
Players of American football from Chicago
American football wide receivers
Canadian football wide receivers
American players of Canadian football
Bowling Green Falcons football players
Chicago Bears players
Saskatchewan Roughriders players
Chicago Rush players
Homewood-Flossmoor High School alumni